Dendrophylax is a genus of leafless neotropical orchids (family Orchidaceae) native to Mexico, Central America, the West Indies, and Florida.  The name is from Greek δένδρον ("tree") and φύλαξ ("guard; keeper").  One species, Dendrophylax lindenii, featured heavily in the book The Orchid Thief.

Biology
The plants of this genus are unusual in that they consist of masses of photosynthetic roots anchored in trees with a highly reduced stem and ephemeral leaves which have been reduced to scales.  The bulk of these plants consists only of flat, cord-like, green roots with distinctive "track marks".  These white track marks are called pneumatodes and function in much the same manner as stomata allowing the photosynthetic roots to perform gas exchange to support photosynthesis.

Phylogeny
Members of this genus are distant relatives of the African and Indian Ocean genus Angraecum; it seems that orchid seed, blowing like dust, crossed the Atlantic at least once and successfully colonized new habitat.  Current evidence derived from molecular studies indicates that the original arrival from Africa which spawned this genus and the related genus Harriselia was a member of the subtribe Angraecineae with small leaves and flowers and a monopodial growth habit, and the leafless habit developed in parallel in both Africa and the Caribbean, since the genes are present in all members of the subtribe Angraecineae and the leafless habit is common in several genera within the Vandeae (Chilochista, Dendrophylax, Harriselia, and Microcoelia).

Cultivation
Several species such as Dendrophylax funalis, Dendrophylax fawcetti, and Dendrophylax lindenii produce large, showy, white flowers which are highly fragrant and described as smelling fruity and reminiscent of an apple.  Most members of this genus are pollinated by various species of moths with very long probosces and the flowers of most species within this genus possess very long nectar spurs ranging from 4 to 8 inches in length on average.  The giant sphinx moth is known to pollinate several species within this genus.

Dendrophylax funalis is more commonly and easily cultivated that other members of the genus and the plants tend to get very large and robust in both habitat and cultivation.  Other members of this genus are very difficult subjects in cultivation such as Dendrophylax lindenii, and some members of this genus defy cultivation or are of little interest to orchid enthusiasts because they produce very small flowers.

Species
Species accepted as of June 2014:

 Dendrophylax alcoa - Dominican Republic
 Dendrophylax barrettiae - Dominican Republic, Haiti, Jamaica, Cuba
 Dendrophylax constanzensis - Dominican Republic
 Dendrophylax fawcetti - Grand Cayman Island
 Dendrophylax filiformis - Dominican Republic, Haiti, Jamaica, Cuba, Puerto Rico
 Dendrophylax funalis - Jamaica
 Dendrophylax gracilis - Cuba
 Dendrophylax helorrhiza - Dominican Republic
 Dendrophylax lindenii - Florida, Bahamas, Cuba
 Dendrophylax macrocarpus - Dominican Republic
 Dendrophylax porrectus - Mexico, El Salvador, Guatemala, Florida, Cayman Islands, Cuba, Hispaniola, Jamaica, Puerto Rico 
 Dendrophylax sallei - Dominican Republic
 Dendrophylax serpentilingua  - Dominican Republic
 Dendrophylax varius - Cuba, Haiti

References

  (Eds) (2014) Genera Orchidacearum Volume 6: Epidendroideae (Part 3); page 383 ff., Oxford: Oxford University Press.

External links

 
Orchids of Central America
Orchids of North America
Flora of the Caribbean
Vandeae genera